The Ross Booth Memorial Bridge, historically known as the Winfield Toll Bridge, also known as, is a historic three-span cantilever Warren Truss bridge located at Winfield and Red House, Putnam County, West Virginia. It was built in 1955, and spans the Kanawha River, carrying West Virginia Route 34. The cantilever through-truss consists of two anchor spans each  in length and the main span  in length between pier center lines. The main span consists of two  cantilever arms and a  suspended span.

It was listed on the National Register of Historic Places in 2011.

References

Road bridges on the National Register of Historic Places in West Virginia
Bridges completed in 1955
Buildings and structures in Putnam County, West Virginia
National Register of Historic Places in Putnam County, West Virginia
Former toll bridges in West Virginia
Cantilever bridges in the United States
Warren truss bridges in the United States
1955 establishments in West Virginia
Kanawha River